The large moth subfamily Lymantriinae contains the following genera beginning with D:

References 

Lymantriinae
Lymantriid genera D